Therme Manchester is a spa and water park resort under construction in Greater Manchester, England. As of 2023, it is scheduled to open in 2025, and is being built on the former site of the EventCity exhibition centre, adjacent to the Trafford Centre.

History

Planning
Plans to realise a large-scale 'wellbeing resort' in TraffordCity were first announced in July 2019, with developers Therme Group inviting local residents to attend a consultation in the summer. Planning permission was subsequently granted to the project by Trafford Council in March 2020.

Construction
Original plans saw the proposed resort opening in 2023, with construction beginning in 2021 - however the COVID-19 pandemic saw this date pushed back by two years - with a 2025 opening date being confirmed in early 2022.

Plans to demolish the EventCity site were submitted in September 2022, with the works initially expected to be completed in Spring 2023, ahead of the main construction. By January 2023, the EventCity building had been completely demolished. In March 2023, construction of Therme Manchester began.

Resort
Upon completion, the resort will occupy . Over 25 pools, 35 waterslides and 30 saunas and steam rooms will make up what Therme Group dub an 'urban oasis' - along with the UK's first indoor all-season beach, with lapping waves.

Barton Dock Road tram stop on the Trafford Park Line of the Metrolink system is located directly outside the resort site.

References

External links 

 

Buildings and structures in Manchester
Water parks in the United Kingdom
Tourist attractions in Manchester